Stephanie Shiao (born 13 August 1968) is a Taiwanese actress, model, singer and writer.

Early life and education
Shiao was born Shiao Xiuxia in Yonghe District of New Taipei City, Taiwan, on August 13, 1968, while her ancestral home in Heze, north China's Shandong province. Her grandfather Xiao Zhichu was a lieutenant general in the National Revolutionary Army of the Republic of China (ROC). She graduated from the Chinese Culture University.

Filmography

Film

Television

References

External links 
 

1968 births
People from Heze
Living people
Chinese Culture University alumni
Taiwanese film actresses
Taiwanese Mandopop singers
Taiwanese television actresses
20th-century Taiwanese actresses
21st-century Taiwanese actresses
21st-century Taiwanese women singers
20th-century Taiwanese women singers